This is a list of rice dishes from all over the world, arranged alphabetically. Rice is the seed of the monocot plants Oryza sativa (Asian rice) or Oryza glaberrima (African rice). As a cereal grain, it is the most widely consumed staple food for a large part of the world's human population, especially in Asia and the West Indies. It is the grain with the second-highest worldwide production, after maize (corn), according to data for 2010.

Rice dishes

Unsorted
 Aiwowo
 Bagoong fried rice
 Buttered rice
 Kanika
 Mutabbaq samak
 Sayadieh

See also

 Arabic rice – a pilaf preparation using rice and vermicelli noodles
 List of fried rice dishes
 List of rice beverages
 List of rice varieties
 List of tortilla-based dishes
 Pakistani rice dishes

References

Rice dishes
Rice dishes
Rice dishes
Rice dishes